A kapa moe is a traditional Hawaiian bedcovering made from tree bark, then beaten and felted to achieve a soft texture and dye stamped in geometric patterns.  Several layers of kapa would be stitched together at the edges to form a kapa moe.

See also
Kapa
Tapa cloth

External links
History of Hawaiian quilting
kapa moe

Hawaii culture
Textile arts of Hawaii